Kevin Gerard Wallace (born 19 June 1957) is an Irish theatre producer.

Early life and career
Wallace was born in Limerick, Ireland, the youngest of the three children of Michael Kevin Wallace and Nancy (née Cussen).  Wallace worked as a stage and television actor in his native Ireland and in Britain, with the Abbey Theatre, the Royal Shakespeare Company (RSC), Bristol Old Vic, The Liverpool Everyman, Oxford Playhouse, Yorkshire Television and the BBC.

Production Career
Kevin Wallace is a Full Member of the Society of London Theatre. 

Before joining The Really Useful Group, Wallace produced The Emperor Jones (Offstage Downstairs), Our Town (Shaftesbury Theatre) starring Alan Alda and Robert Sean Leonard with Jonny Lee Miller in his first West End role, and Tim Luscombe's Eurovision starring Anita Dobson and James Dreyfus In January 2002 he re-established Kevin Wallace Limited (KWL), to produce musicals and plays.  During 2002, KWL presented the multi-award winning Traverse Theatre/National Theatre production of Gregory Burke's Gagarin Way (Arts Theatre), directed by John Tiffany and the Abbey Theatre Dublin production of Eden by Eugene O'Brien (also at the Arts)  Directed by Conor McPherson, Eden won both the Irish Times/ESB Award and the Stewart Parker Award for Best New Play.

Really Useful Group
Wallace was in-house producer with Andrew Lloyd Webber's Really Useful Group (RUG) for eight years, where he was responsible for Celebration, Andrew Lloyd Webber's 50th Birthday Concert at the Royal Albert Hall starring Glenn Close, Antonio Banderas, Sarah Brightman and Elaine Paige; Whistle Down the Wind (Aldwych Theatre), which featured "No Matter What", the hit single recorded by Boyzone; The Beautiful Game (Cambridge Theatre), winner, Best Musical, in the Critics' Circle Theatre Awards 2000 and Closer to Heaven (Arts Theatre), with music and lyrics by the Pet Shop Boys and starring Frances Barber.

He also established productions of The Phantom of the Opera in Switzerland, Belgium, Mexico and Denmark; a US tour of Cats; the original production of Sunset Boulevard, directed by Trevor Nunn, in Germany, and produced the new production of Sunset Boulevard, directed by Robert Carsen and starring Faith Brown.  Wallace produced the UK tour of Jesus Christ Superstar, directed by Gale Edwards, and won an International Emmy Award in 2001 as Executive Producer of the film based on that production. Wallace also produced the Broadway production of Jesus Christ Superstar, (Foxwoods Theatre), directed by Gale Edwards, that received a 2000 Tony Award Nomination for Best Musical Revival.

The Lord of the Rings stage production
Wallace, with Saul Zaentz, produced The Lord of the Rings directed by Matthew Warchus, with music by A. R. Rahman, Värttinä and Christopher Nightingale.  The Lord of the Rings played in Toronto (Princess of Wales Theatre), where the show was nominated for 15 Dora Awards, winning 7, including "Outstanding New Musical" and awards for direction (Matthew Warchus), costume design (Rob Howell) and choreography (Peter Darling) and in London (Theatre Royal, Drury Lane), where it was nominated for 7 Whatsonstage Theatregoer's Choice Awards in 2007 and 5 Olivier Awards in 2008.

Other productions
In 2009 Wallace produced the Christmas season of Stuart Wood's music hall musical, Frank's Closet, starring Russell Whitehead and Gary Amers, at the Hoxton Hall in London's East End.

In 2012 Wallace was a co-producer on the musical, Loserville, by Elliot Davis and James Bourne, at The Quarry Theatre, West Yorkshire Playhouse, Leeds. Loserville transferred from West Yorkshire Playhouse to The Garrick Theatre in London's West End in October 2012, and received a Best New Musical 2013 Olivier Awards nomination.

Wallace was consultant producer to the Australian-based company, Global Creatures, on their stage adaptation King Kong, directed by Daniel Kramer, which had its world premiere in Melbourne (Regent Theatre, Melbourne) on 15 June 2013.

In 2016 Kevin Wallace and its Brazilian partners in Tempo Entertainment, premiered a musical based on "Gabriela Clove and Cinnamon" by "Jorge Amado", opening at TEATRO CETIP, São Paulo.  Gabriela, adapted for the stage by Adriana Falcão and João Falcão, and directed by João Falcão, won three Bibi Ferreira Awards; Best Brazilian Musical, Best Lighting and Best Direction, and an APCA Cultural Award for Best Director.

In 2017 KWL co-produced I Capture the Castle, a musical based on the Dodie Smith novel, with Book & Lyrics by Teresa Howard and Music by Steven Edis, at Watford Palace Theatre.

Wallace was Creative & Consultant Producer on the Seven Ages production of Cinderella directed by Joe Graves and designed by Ti Green that opened at Shanghai Cultural Square Theatre in May 2018 and toured throughout China until September 2019.

KWL has a New Production of The Lord of the Rings in development.

Honours and awards
Kevin Wallace is a Fellow of Rose Bruford College of Theatre and Performance.

Olivier Awards for Best New Musical

1999: Whistle Down the Wind (Nomination)
2001: The Beautiful Game (Nomination)
2008: The Lord of the Rings (Nomination)
2013: Loserville (Nomination)

Tony Awards for Best Revival of a Musical

2000: Jesus Christ Superstar (Nomination)

Critics' Circle Theatre Awards for Best Musical

2001: The Beautiful Game (Won)

Dora Awards for Outstanding New Musical

2006: The Lord of the Rings (Won)

International Emmy Awards for Outstanding Performing Arts Program

2001: Jesus Christ Superstar (Won)

References

External links
Lord of the Rings official site for London stage production {{This link is to a website announcement from 2015.}}
Kevin Wallace in 'Actors' file at Limerick City Library, Ireland

British theatre managers and producers
Living people
1957 births